Yared Nuguse (born June 1, 1999) is an American middle-distance runner who specializes in the 1500 meters. He was the 2019 NCAA Division I champion in the event. Nuguse is the North American indoor record holder for the 1500 meters, one mile and 3000 meters.

Career
Nuguse attended DuPont Manual High School in Louisville, Kentucky, where he was a successful high school runner prior to attending the University of Notre Dame.

He competed collegiately for the Notre Dame Fighting Irish.

In 2019, he anchored the Fighting Irish to victory in the Distance Medley Relay at the NCAA Division I Indoor T&F Championships before winning the 1500 meters at the NCAA Division I Outdoor T&F Championships just six days past his 20th birthday.

On May 13, 2021, Nuguse set the NCAA 1500 meters record in a time of 3:34.36, which also met the Olympic standard. At the NCAA Division I T&F Championships, he finished second to Cole Hocker in a time of 3:35.60. Nuguse qualified for the 1500 m at the postponed 2020 Tokyo Olympics by finishing third at the U.S. Olympic Trials with his personal best time of 3:34.68, but did not participate in the Games due to a quad injury.

On February 12, 2022, he broke the 18-year-old NCAA indoor 3000 meters record in a time of 7:38.13 at the BU Valentine Invitational. Nuguse capped off his 2022 NCAA indoor season at the 2022 NCAA Division I Indoor Track and Field Championships, where he anchored Notre Dame's Distance Medley Relay team to a second place finish. He also placed ninth in the 3000 meters.

2023
On January 27, at the Boston University John Thomas Terrier Classic in Boston, the 23-year-old broke the North American indoor record in the 3000 m with a time of 7:28.24, slicing nearly two seconds off Galen Rupp’s mark set in February 2013. Nuguse’s time was also faster than the 7:28.48 outdoor record, which Grant Fisher set in 2022. With a quick 3:56.96 last 1600 m, he moved to ninth on the world indoor all-time list.

On February 11, he ran the second-fastest indoor mile in history with a time of 3:47.38 at the Millrose Games in New York, smashing by more than two seconds Bernard Lagat’s (who was a two-time world outdoor champion) 18-year-old North American indoor record of 3:49.98. Nuguse simultaneously broke also his indoor 1500 m record, which was set in the same race in 2005. He narrowly missed out on Yomif Kejelcha's world indoor mile record of 3:47.01 and eclipsed by more than a second best mark of famous multiple world record-holder Hicham El Guerrouj. Nuguse covered 200 m segment from 1400 to 1600 m in a very fast 25.94 to beat a quality field and set the second-fastest North American mile ever, indoors or outdoors.

References

External links
 

1999 births
Living people
American male long-distance runners
Notre Dame Fighting Irish men's track and field athletes
Sportspeople from Louisville, Kentucky
Track and field athletes from Kentucky
American male middle-distance runners
American people of Ethiopian descent